Gurdial Singh Rahi (Gurdi'āl Sigh; 10 January 1933 – 16 August 2016) was an Indian writer and novelist who wrote in Punjabi. He started his literary career in 1957 with a short story, "Bhaganwale." He became known as a novelist when he published the novel Marhi Da Deeva in 1964. The novel was later adapted into the Punjabi film Marhi Da Deeva in 1989, directed by Surinder Singh. His novel Anhe Ghore Da Daan was also made into a film of the same name in 2011 by director Gurvinder Singh. Singh was honoured with the Padma Shri in 1998 and Jnanpith Award in 1999.

Life and work

Early life
Gurdial Singh was born on 10 January 1933 in the village of Bhaini Fateh near Jaitu in British Punjab. His father, Jagat Singh, was a carpenter, and his mother, Nihal Kaur, took care of the household. The young Singh began working as a carpenter at the age of 12 to support his family's poor financial conditions. By his own admission, Singh worked 16 hours a day when he took on various jobs such as making wheels for bullock carts and metal sheet forming for water tanks. Together, he and his father earned  a day from hard labour.

In childhood, Singh was interested in painting but gradually he applied himself to a formal education. After successfully persuading Singh's father that his son was worthy of more schooling, Madan Mohan Sharma, the headmaster of a middle school that Singh attended in Jaito, encouraged the young boy to stick with his studies, even though his father thought it was futile. Singh completed his Matric examination while he worked in various day time jobs. At the age of 14, he married Balwant Kaur. In 1962, he took the job of school teacher in Nandpur Kotra which paid him  in monthly salary. Meanwhile, Singh continued his own education, went on to receive his B.A. in English and History, and followed that up with a M.A. in 1967.

Literary career
Singh started his literary career in 1957 with a short story, "Bhaganwale", which was published in Panj Darya, a magazine edited by Mohan Singh. His later stories were published in Preetlari, edited by Gurbaksh Singh. His major work, Marhi Da Deeva, established his reputation as a novelist. Singh wrote four different versions of the novel over the course of four years, before he decided to publish the fourth and final one in 1964. The various characters Singh portrayed in the novel were recreations of real-life people woven into a fictitious storyline. It was translated into English by Sahitya Akademi as The Last Flicker.

Singh's other notable works included the  novels Anhoe (1966), Addh Chanani Raat (1972), Anhe Ghore Da Daan (1976) and Parsa (1991); collections of short stories, including Saggi Phull (1962), Kutta Te Aadmi (1971), Begana Pind (1985) and Kareer Di Dhingri (1991); and autobiographies Neean Mattiyan (1999) and Dojee Dehi (2000) published in two parts. The novels Addh Chanani Raat and Parsa have been translated into English as Night of the Half Moon (published by Macmillan) and Parsa by the National Book Trust, respectively.

Singh's favourite works included Leo Tolstoy's Anna Karenina, Irving Stone's Lust for Life, John Steinbeck's The Grapes Of Wrath, Phanishwar Nath Renu's Maila Anchal, Prem Chand's Godaan and Yashpal's Divya.

Awards and honours
Singh received various awards over the course of his life, including the Sahitya Akademi Award in Punjabi in 1975 for the novel Adh Chanani Raat, the Soviet Land Nehru Award in 1986, the Bhai Veer Singh Fiction Award in 1992, the Shiromani Sahitkar Award in 1992, the Jnanpith Award in 1999 and the Padma Shri in 1998. He shared the Jnanpith Award with Hindi language author Nirmal Verma.

Death
Singh suffered from a heart attack earlier in 2016 after which he was partially paralysed. On 13 August 2016 he fell unconscious at his home in Jaitu and was admitted into a private hospital at Bathinda where he was kept on ventilator support. He died on 16 August 2016, when he was taken off life support systems, after it was determined that Singh had shown no signs of recovery. He is survived by his wife, Balwant Kaur, a son and two daughters.

Works
Singh has published various novels, short story collections, plays, children's literature and also an autobiography in two parts.
 Sapno Ke - Se Din was one of his works, talking about his childhood days and is included in CBSE class 10 Hindi course B.

References

External links
 All Literature of Gurdial Singh

1933 births
2016 deaths
Punjabi-language writers
Indian Sikhs
Indian male novelists
Recipients of the Jnanpith Award
Recipients of the Sahitya Akademi Award in Punjabi
Recipients of the Padma Shri in literature & education
20th-century Indian novelists
Novelists from Punjab, India
People from Faridkot district
20th-century Indian short story writers
Indian male short story writers
20th-century Indian male writers